Colver-Rogers Farmstead, also known as the Norval P. Rogers House, is a historic home located at Morgan Township in Greene County, Pennsylvania. The original section was built in 1830, and is a two-story, stone dwelling, with a two-story stone kitchen wing, in a vernacular Greek Revival-style.  The house was modified about 1906, with the addition of a gambrel roof and rambling porch with Colonial Revival-style design elements. Also on the property is a bank barn (c. 1880) and large wash house (c. 1906).

It was listed on the National Register of Historic Places in 2003.

References 

Houses on the National Register of Historic Places in Pennsylvania
Greek Revival houses in Pennsylvania
Colonial Revival architecture in Pennsylvania
Houses completed in 1906
Houses in Greene County, Pennsylvania
National Register of Historic Places in Greene County, Pennsylvania
1906 establishments in Pennsylvania